The 1985 Italian Open was a tennis tournament played on outdoor clay courts at the Foro Italico in Rome in Italy that was part of the 1985 Nabisco Grand Prix and of 1985 Virginia Slims World Championship Series. The men's tournament was held from 13 May through 18 May 1985, while the women's tournament was held from 4 May through 10 May 1985. Yannick Noah and Raffaella Reggi won the singles title.

Finals

Men's singles

 Yannick Noah defeated  Miloslav Mečíř 6–4, 3–6, 6–2, 7–6

Women's singles

 Raffaella Reggi defeated  Vicki Nelson-Dunbar 6–4, 6–4

Men's doubles

 Anders Järryd /  Mats Wilander defeated  Ken Flach /  Robert Seguso 4–6, 6–3, 6–2

Women's doubles

 Sandra Cecchini /  Raffaella Reggi defeated  Patrizia Murgo /  Barbara Romanò 1–6, 6–4, 6–3

References

External links
 ATP Archive 1985:Grand Prix Tour: Accessed 17/05/2011.
WTA Archive 1985: Virginia Slims Tour: Accessed 17/05/2011.

Italian Open
Italian Open
Italian Open (tennis)
Italian Open (Tennis), 1985
Italian Open